Park West is a Metromover station in the Park West neighborhood of Downtown, Miami, Florida.

This station is located at the intersection of Northeast Second Avenue and Eighth Street. It opened to service May 26, 1994, and is two blocks northwest of the Miami-Dade Arena.

Station layout

Places of interest
Miami-Dade Arena
Museum Park
Marinablue
Ten Museum Park
Paramount Miami Worldcenter
900 Biscayne Bay
One Thousand Museum

External links
 MDT – Metromover Stations
 8th Street entrance from Google Maps Street View
 9th Street entrance from Google Maps Street View

Metromover stations
Railway stations in the United States opened in 1994
1994 establishments in Florida
Omni Loop